The 2021 U20 Barthés Trophy tournament was held from 24 June to 11 July 2021 in Nairobi, Kenya. Only three nations participated in the event, hosts Kenya competed against Senegal and Madagascar. Kenya eventually won the tournament.

Standings

Fixtures

References 

Under-20 rugby union competitions
Under
2021 in African rugby union